Aphonopelma prenticei is a species of spiders in the family Theraphosidae, found in United States (California, Nevada, Utah and Arizona).

References

prenticei
Spiders described in 2016
Spiders of the United States